Bruno Rigutto (born 12 August 1945) is a French pianist, composer and conductor.

Career 
Born in Charenton-le-Pont,
Rigutto studied at the Conservatoire de Paris where he was a student of Samson François and Paul Badura-Skoda. In 1965 he was a laureate of the Long-Thibaud-Crespin Competition and the International Tchaikovsky Competition in 1966. He has been teaching the piano at the Conservatoire de Paris since 1981. Rigutto composed the music for Nina Companéez's feature film Faustine et le Bel Été in 1972.

Selected discography 
 Piano Recital: Chopin, Liszt, Schumann (Kinderszenen) 1969 Musiidisc, France.
 Chopin's Nocturnes, at Emi;
 Chopin's Piano Concerto No. 1  and No. 2, Budapest Philharmonic Orchestra, with Erich Bergel at Denon; Andante spianato et grande polonaise brillante Op. 22 at Decca/Aristrocrate;
 Chopin's 19 Waltzes, sleeve by Sempé at Frolane;
 Tchaikovsky's Piano Concerto No. 1 and Violin Concerto with Jean-Pierre Wallez, Monte-Carlo Philharmonic Orchestra, with Yuri Ahronovitch at IPG;
 Haydn's Keyboard Concerto No. 11 in D major - G Major at Decca;
 J-S Bach's Concertos for 1, 2, 3 and 4 pianos at Emi;
 Mozart's Piano Sonata No. 11; 
 R. Schumann's Piano Concerto, Konzertstuck with the Orchestre National de France conducted by Kurt Masur at Aristocrate;
 Antonín Dvořák's Piano Concerto, Orchestre philharmonique de Radio France, Zdeněk Mácal at Decca, IPG, Peters;

References

External links 
 Rigutto's discography on Discogs
 Bruno Rigutto on Radio Classique
 Bruno Rigutto on France Musique
 Bruno Rigutto plays Chopin's Nocturne No 13 Op.48/1 (1979) (YouTube)
 Bruno Rigutto on Schola Cantorum de Paris

1945 births
People from Charenton-le-Pont
Living people
20th-century French male classical pianists
French male conductors (music)
20th-century French composers
French film score composers
Conservatoire de Paris alumni
Academic staff of the Conservatoire de Paris
Long-Thibaud-Crespin Competition prize-winners
Chevaliers of the Légion d'honneur
20th-century French conductors (music)
21st-century French conductors (music)
French male film score composers
21st-century French male classical pianists